Kalulis is a type of traditional boat from eastern Indonesia. It is mainly built in Kei islands, Southeast direction from Seram. It is mainly used for interinsular transport, but they are unsuitable for long haul voyages between Moluccas, Sulawesi, and Java. It is also known as perahu kalulis, ang kalulis, kalulus, and kulis.

Description 
These boats is fairly shallow and beamy, and rigged with tanja rig on 1 or 2 masts, presumably in tripod mast. It is steered using double lateral rudders, and having a deckhouse. These boats are internally dowelled and contain lugs on all the planks. In the past, they are lashed together using fiber through carved lugs on the plank interior, but this technique has been disappeared in Kei islands during 1940s. They are between 4.5 and 14 m in length, with beam-to-length ratio varied between 1:2.33 to 1:3. The average depth of 5.25-7.5 m long kalulis was 1.3 m.

Since 1945, they have been fitted with fixed wooden ribs (gading) and had 5-8 planks. Materials of modern boats were different from older boats: The ropes which was originally made from coconut husk (tali utis) and gemutu (tali nauk) were replaced by polypropylene ropes. The sail which was made from sago leaf matting or karoro (sacking, sorat pisang of Java), now being made by cotton or polypropylene cloth, sometimes polyethylene sheets. Modern boats used the gaff and gunter (nade) rig. The double lateral rudders (cangkilan) generally have been replaced by a centerline rudder. Because they had no keel, stability was an issue, so they are not suited for voyage between main islands of Indonesia.

Role 
They are used for middle-distance journey between Geser, Gorom, Watubela, Teor, Kei, Tayandu, Aru, and Papuan coasts. These boats are used for transporting passengers and cargo, and occasionally for fishing, turtle hunting, and collecting agar-agar. These boats is the traditional mainstay for sago inter-island trade.

Replica 

 One replica of kalulis built by Tim Severin is named Alfred Wallace. The boat is used in "The Spice Islands Voyage", the last of Severin's nautical adventures, reenacting naturalist Alfred Russel Wallace's voyage in the archipelago. The 14-metre craft was much smaller than those generally used by Wallace. Severin did have a few modern adaptations: a satellite communications system, a wind generator and a nine-horsepower motor for emergencies.

See also 

 Knabat bogolu
 Kelulus
 Jong
 Orembai
 Benawa

References

Further reading 

 Ellen, R. F. (2003). On the Edge of the Banda Zone: Past and Present in the Social Organization of a Moluccan Trading Network. University of Hawaii press. .

Sailboat types
Indonesian inventions
Types of fishing vessels
Boats of Indonesia